Carlos Alberto Díaz (born November 28, 1982) is a Colombian  footballer who plays as a defender for Boyacá Chicó.

Titles

References

External links
 

1982 births
Living people
Colombian footballers
Association football defenders
Deportivo Pereira footballers
Atlético Nacional footballers
Once Caldas footballers
Envigado F.C. players
Cúcuta Deportivo footballers
Atlético Huila footballers
Boyacá Chicó F.C. footballers
Categoría Primera A players
Categoría Primera B players
Sportspeople from Antioquia Department